Albert Guinon (1863-1923) was a French playwright.

Works 
 Seul, two-act play;
 A qui la faute, one-act comedy, Paris: Paul Ollendorf, 1892
 Le bonheur; comédie en trois actes, par Albert Guinon ... [Paris, L’Illustration] c1911. 32 p. illus. 29 cm.
 Remarques autour de la guerre (1914-1915). Paris, Librairie théâtrale, artistique et littéraire, c1916. 156 p. 19 cm.
 Nouvelles remarques autour de la querre (1916-1919), Paris, Librairie théâtrale, artistique & littéraire, 1920.
 Son père; comédie en quatre actes. [Paris] c. 1907.
 Décadence; Paris, Librairie théâtrale [1901?] 3 p. l., [ix]-x, [2], 268 p. 19 cm.

External links 
Evene - Albert Guinon
Mots-Auteurs.fr - Albert Guinon
Base Leonore

19th-century French dramatists and playwrights
20th-century French dramatists and playwrights
Chevaliers of the Légion d'honneur
Writers from Paris
1923 deaths
1863 births